Waßmannsdorf is a village and a civil parish (Ortsteil) of the German town of Schönefeld, located in the district of Dahme-Spreewald in Brandenburg. As of 2007 its population was of around 1,000.

History
First mentioned in 1350 as Wasmanstorp, the village was an autonomous municipality until 2003, when it merged into Schönefeld. From 1961 to 1989 its municipal borders with West Berlin were crossed by the Berlin Wall.

Geography
Waßmannsdorf is located in the southeastern suburb of Berlin, near the districts of Tempelhof-Schöneberg, Neukölln and Treptow-Köpenick; and bordering with the quarter of Rudow. The nearest places are Großziethen, Selchow, Schönefeld and Blankenfelde-Mahlow. The village is 20 km far from Königs Wusterhausen, 28 from Ludwigsfelde and 34 from Potsdam.

Transport

Waßmannsdorf is situated close to the runway of the new Berlin Brandenburg Airport. Crossed by the Berlin outer ring, it is served by a new railway station on the S-Bahn extension to the new airport (lines S45 and S9). The village is also interested by the Expressway Potsdam-Schönefeld projects.

Gallery

References

External links

 Waßmannsdorf page on Schönefeld municipal website
 Waßmannsdorf Fire Service
 SV Waßmannsdorf football club

Villages in Brandenburg
Localities in Dahme-Spreewald
Former municipalities in Brandenburg
Populated places established in the 1350s